Tar River Poetry is a literary journal published by East Carolina University (ECU). Published twice a year (fall and spring), the 64-page journal consists of submitted written works of poetry, critical essays, and book reviews.  The journal is named for the Tar River, which runs through Greenville, NC (home of ECU). First published in 1960.

History
The journal grew out of an earlier publication, Tar River Poets, originally edited by ECU English professor and Director of the ECU Poetry Forum Vernon Ward.  Tar River Poets published members of the Poetry Forum only (that is, poets local to Greenville, NC).  Upon Prof. Ward's retirement, poet Peter Makuck took over the editorship and renamed the journal, opening it to outside submissions and publishing the first issue as Tar River Poetry in November 1978, but retaining the numbering system of the earlier journal (thus the first issue with the new name was published as issue 18, number 1). The 30th Anniversary issue, published in December 2008, included an interview with Makuck.

Contributors and editors
Tar River Poetry has published many of the best-known American poets of the late 20th and early 21st century, including Pulitzer Prize and National Book Award winners Claudia Emerson, William Stafford, Louis Simpson, Carolyn Kizer, Henry Taylor, and A.R. Ammons, and many other well-known poets including Sharon Olds, Leslie Norris, William Matthews, Albert Goldbarth, and Patricia Goedicke.
 
Vernon Ward (founder - 1978)
Peter Makuck (1978 - 2006)
Luke Whisnant (2006–present), with Carolyn Elkins Associate Editor

References

Ettari, Gary.  "The Poet and the Sea: An Interview with Peter Makuck." North Carolina Literary Review Number 16 (2007): 66–74.
Smith, Leanne E.  "ECU Poetry Forum: History."  http://www.ecu.edu/org/poetryforum/history.html

External links
Tar River Poetry Website

Poetry magazines published in the United States
Biannual magazines published in the United States
East Carolina University
Magazines established in 1978
Magazines published in North Carolina